Julian Reus (born 29 April 1988) is a German track and field athlete who competes in the 100 and 200 meters dash. His 100 m personal best of 10.01 seconds is the German record. Though unofficial according to IAAF regulations of a maximum +2.0 m/s tailwind for a valid time, he also clocked 9.99 seconds (+4.8 m/s) during the men's 100 metres at the 2017 IAAF Diamond League.

Reus won the silver medal at the 2012 European Athletics Championships in Helsinki at the 4 × 100 metres relay.

Competition record

See also
 German all-time top lists – 100 metres

External links

 

1988 births
Living people
Sportspeople from Hanau
German male sprinters
German national athletics champions
Olympic athletes of Germany
Athletes (track and field) at the 2012 Summer Olympics
Athletes (track and field) at the 2016 Summer Olympics
European Athletics Championships medalists
World Athletics Championships athletes for Germany
Athletes (track and field) at the 2020 Summer Olympics